Blue Tornado is a steel inverted roller coaster at Gardaland, Castelnuovo del Garda, outside Verona, Italy. It is an extended standard model, with additional helix, of the Suspended Looping Coaster manufactured by Vekoma. The ride's highest force is at 4.5G's during the sidewinder inversion. A model Panavia Tornado fighter jet is seen on top of the station for decorative purposes.

Accidents and incidents
In August 1999, a 17-year-old boy from Treviso, Italy died of a heart attack while riding the roller coaster. It was later proven that the boy suffered a life threatening heart disease.

On May 10, 2001, a 15-year-old boy from Germany also died of a heart attack while on the ride. The 15-year-old suffered from a lifelong heart condition and according to reports, ignored advice from friends and signs not to board the ride if suffering from a heart condition.

External links
 http://www.gardaland.it/en/attrazioni/blu_tornado/

Gardaland rides
Roller coasters in Italy
Roller coasters operated by Merlin Entertainments
Roller coasters introduced in 1998